The Mughal Bridge, at Karnal in Haryana state of India, was built during the reign of Shah Jahan and it is mentioned in Jahangir's memoirs of Tuzk-e-Jahangiri.

History 

The bridge was laid out by Shah Jahan. It is an example of Mughal architecture. The bridge was used to facilitate travelers during the 17th Century and locally called Badshahi Pul. This bridge is also known as 'Old Badshahi Bridge'.This bridge was built around 1540-44 AD.Its situated near National Highway number 1.

Architecture 

Its structurally sound bridge consisting of three arches made up of stone. There are four domed shaped tops strengthened by buttresses and arches on either sides. This bridge is protected by Haryana Government but still in dilapidated condition.

See also 

 Grand Trunk Road
 Haryana Tourism
 History of Haryana
 List of Monuments of National Importance in Haryana
 List of State Protected Monuments in Haryana
 List of protected areas of Haryana

References 

Bridges in Haryana
Mughal architecture